Marian Bondrea (born 2 November 1950) is a Romanian football manager and former footballer. His last managerial job was at Ceahlăul Piatra Neamț.

Playing career
Born in Craiova, Marian Bondrea started his career at Electroputere (1969–1970), in the second division, he went on to play for Universitatea Craiova in (1972), but has only played there three official matches, was sent back at Electroputere in (1973), before joining Şoimii Sibiu in (1974–1975). He returns to Electroputere in (1975–1976) until 1978, where he finishes his career.

Coaching career
The first coaching performance he gained was with FC Inter Sibiu, helping his team to get promoted in the first league Divizia A in 1988. After that he went back in his hometown and managed Electroputere, where he surprisingly took his team from second division, to the European competitions. He promoted them in 1991, and ended on third-place during the 1991–92 season above Universitatea Craiova their rivals at that time, enough to get a spot for the UEFA Cup. During the 1992–93 season, he was appointed as head-coach for Universitatea Craiova and ended third again, but brought his team to the Romanian Cup finals and won it. A year later he manages his team again to the Romanian Cup finals, but loses to Gloria Bistriţa and finishing as runners-up in the Romanian league 1993–94 season. He then moved to Bucharest to coach FC Naţional in the 1995–96 season, being replaced after a couple of months. During the years, he also coached in Turkey, Saudi Arabia and Syria.

References

1950 births
Living people
Sportspeople from Craiova
Romanian footballers
Association football midfielders
Liga II players
Romanian football managers
FC U Craiova 1948 managers
FC Argeș Pitești managers
FC Progresul București managers
FC Dinamo București managers
FC Inter Sibiu managers
Altay S.K. managers
FC Astra Giurgiu managers
FC Bihor Oradea managers
SCM Râmnicu Vâlcea managers
CSM Ceahlăul Piatra Neamț managers
Expatriate football managers in Turkey
Expatriate football managers in Syria
Expatriate football managers in Saudi Arabia
Romanian expatriate sportspeople in Turkey
Romanian expatriate sportspeople in Syria
Romanian expatriate sportspeople in Saudi Arabia